The Shiffner Baronetcy, of Coombe in the County of Sussex, is a title in the Baronetage of the United Kingdom. It was created on 16 December 1818 for George Shiffner, Member of Parliament for Lewes from 1812 to 1826.

Shiffner baronets, of Coombe (1818)

Sir George Shiffner, 1st Baronet (1762–1842)
Sir Henry Shiffner, 2nd Baronet (1788–1859)
Sir George Shiffner, 3rd Baronet (1791–1863)
Sir George Croxton Shiffner, 4th Baronet (1819–1906)
Sir John Shiffner, 5th Baronet (1857–1914)
Sir John Bridger Shiffner, 6th Baronet (1899–1918)
Sir Henry Burrowes Shiffner, 7th Baronet (1902–1941)
Sir Henry David Shiffner, 8th Baronet (1930–2018)
Sir Michael George Edward Shiffner, 9th Baronet (born 1963)

The heir presumptive is the current holder's cousin, Rear-Adm. John Robert Shiffner (born 1941)

Notes

References
Kidd, Charles, Williamson, David (editors). Debrett's Peerage and Baronetage (1990 edition). New York: St Martin's Press, 1990,

External links
Painting of Sir George Shiffner, 1st Baronet

Shiffner